Dark Palace is a novel by the Australian author Frank Moorhouse that won the 2001 Miles Franklin Literary Award.

The novel forms the second part of the author's "Edith Trilogy", following Grand Days, which was published in 1993; and preceding Cold Light, which was published in 2011. The trilogy is a fictional account of the League of Nations; it traces the strange, convoluted life of a young woman who enters the world of diplomacy in the 1920s, through to her involvement in the newly formed International Atomic Energy Agency after World War II.

Plot

A direct sequel to Grand Days and beginning in 1931, the novel traces the private and public lives of an Australian woman Edith Campbell Berry, during her final years as an official of the League of Nations based in Geneva. Berry's crumbling marriage parallels the futility of the League's attempts at negotiated disarmament, though she is reunited with her former lover, a cross-dressing Englishman. Returning on leave to Australia, Berry finds she now has little in common with her homeland, after her years of moving in European diplomatic circles. She remains with the Secretary-General's Office at the half-empty Palais des Nations throughout World War II, while a skeleton Secretariat attempts to continue the peacetime functions of the League. In 1945 Berry accompanies a delegation of senior League officials to San Francisco, in the expectation that they will all have key roles to play in the newly established United Nations. To her humiliation and anger they are excluded from any involvement in the setting up of the new organization. The League itself is dissolved a few months later and Berry moves to Canberra, aspiring to a new career in the Australian Department of External Affairs (Cold Light).

Awards

Miles Franklin Literary Award, 2001: winner
 In 2001 in a press release the administrators of the Victorian Premier's Literary Awards, the State Library of Victoria, erroneously named Dark Palace as the winner of that year's award, when in fact the decision had gone to Peter Carey's True History of the Kelly Gang.

Reviews

Portrait 
A portrait of Frank Moorhouse entitled, "Uncle Frank's Dark Palace" was painted by Prof Wei Cheng (his nephew by marriage), to mark the writer's 80th birthday. Full of symbolism, the huge portrait references the trilogy, “Grand Days" with his favourite martini in reach; a copy of the book "Dark Palace;" while the cold light reflection on his face from the computer screen symbolises the third and final book in the trilogy, "Cold Light."

The initial sitting for the portrait was done in the library of the Royal Automobile Club of Australia in Sydney, where he sat in a favoured corner of the Club which is reflected in the painting's background. For it was in RACA where he wrote for a time, while a resident of the club. He was a member of RACA for 32 years. The portrait was entered in the Archibald Prize 2019. (Oil on Canvas. 2m x 1.5m.)

References 

2000 Australian novels
Australian historical novels
Miles Franklin Award-winning works
Novels set in Switzerland
Novels set in Australia
Novels set during World War II
Novels by Frank Moorhouse
Random House books